Frank Jones Sulloway (December 11, 1883 – July 22, 1981) was an American tennis player active in the early 20th century.

Biography
He was born on December 11, 1883, in Franklin, New Hampshire. He attended Harvard University and Harvard Law School.

Sulloway reached the quarterfinals of the U.S. National Championships in 1908 and made the third round a further four times. He died on July 22, 1981, in Concord, New Hampshire.

Grand Slam tournament performance timeline

Legacy
He was the grandfather of psychologist Frank Sulloway.

References

External links 

American male tennis players
1883 births
1981 deaths
People from Franklin, New Hampshire
Harvard Law School alumni
Tennis people from New Hampshire
Harvard College alumni